St Bartholomew was a ward of the County Borough of Birmingham. It was abolished in 1949.

Ward description
The ward covered an area of Birmingham just south-east of the city centre.

Ward history
The ward was in existence in 1911, when the boundaries of the city council were extended and the number of wards extended from 18 to 30 wards in all. At that stage three councillors were elected, and then in subsequent years there were single elections.

In 1949 the boundaries of Birmingham wards were reviewed, and as St Bartholomew had 12,015 electors at the 1949 election, with the average across the city being 23,241, it resulted in the abolition of the ward, which was split between Market Hall and St Martins & Deritend wards.

Parliamentary representation
The ward has been part of Birmingham Bordesley from 1888 to 1918 and Birmingham Deritend from 1918 until the ward's abolition.

Politics
Upon its creation in 1911 the seat was a Liberal stronghold and they retained it throughout the next decade. However, in the early  1920s all three parties became competitive at times, and each won the ward at various times. Labour however became the dominant party and after 1926 only lost it once which was in the disaster of 1931, when they failed to win any Birmingham wards.

Election results

1940s

1930s

1920s

1910s

References

Former wards of Birmingham, West Midlands